Pickanjinnie is a rural locality in the Maranoa Region, Queensland, Australia.

Geography 
Pickanjinnie railway station is an abandoned railway station on the Western railway line.

Road infrastructure
The Warrego Highway runs along the southern boundary.

History 

The locality's name is an Aboriginal word meaning place of land and water where the tortoise goes.

Poybah Provisional School opened circa in 1896. In 1901 it was renamed Pickenjennie Provisional School. On 1 January 1909 it became Pickenjennie State School. It closed circa 1926.

In December 1930, tenders were called to relocate the Pickenjinnie school building  to Vale View.

Education 
There are no schools in Pickanjinnie. The nearest primary school is Wallumbilla State School in neighbouring Wallumbilla to the south-east. The nearest secondary schools are Wallumbilla State School (to Year 10) and Roma State College (to Year 12) in Roma to the west.

References

External links 

Maranoa Region
Localities in Queensland